Fardin Masoumi Valadi (born 10 November 1977 in Masal) is an Iranian wrestler.

References

External links
 

1977 births
Living people
Iranian male sport wrestlers
Wrestlers at the 2008 Summer Olympics
Olympic wrestlers of Iran
Asian Games silver medalists for Iran
Asian Games bronze medalists for Iran
Asian Games medalists in wrestling
Wrestlers at the 2006 Asian Games
Wrestlers at the 2010 Asian Games
Pahlevans of Iran
World Wrestling Championships medalists
Medalists at the 2006 Asian Games
Medalists at the 2010 Asian Games
Sportspeople from Gilan province
20th-century Iranian people
21st-century Iranian people